Nicholas Johnson Mill, also known as Schollenberger Mill, is a historic grist mill located in Colebrookdale Township, Berks County, Pennsylvania.  The mill was built in 1861, and is a -story, plus basement, brick building on a stone foundation.  It measures 36 feet by 40 feet and is three bays wide and four bays deep.  Also on the property are a -story, brick farmhouse built in 1838; a Switzer bank barn built about 1850; stone and log tenant house from the early 1800s; and some elements of the water power system.

It was listed on the National Register of Historic Places in 1990.

References

Grinding mills in Berks County, Pennsylvania
Grinding mills on the National Register of Historic Places in Pennsylvania
Industrial buildings completed in 1861
Houses in Berks County, Pennsylvania
1861 establishments in Pennsylvania
National Register of Historic Places in Berks County, Pennsylvania